Trelawny or Trelawney is a habitational surname that originated in Cornwall. The family are said to have descended from Haemlin, who held several manors from Robert, Count of Mortain, according to the Domesday Book.

People
 Trelawny baronets
 Charles Trelawny (disambiguation), several people:
 Charles Trelawny (died 1731), soldier and MP for East Looe and Plymouth
 Charles Trelawny (of Coldrenick) (fl. 1740s), MP for Liskeard
 Charles Trelawny Brereton, born Charles Trelawny (died 1820), MP for Mitchell
 Edward Trelawney, Dean of Exeter between 1717 and 1726
 Edward Trelawny (colonial administrator) (1699–1754), British governor of Jamaica
 Edward John Trelawny (1792–1881), biographer and novelist, friend of Byron and Shelley
 Harry Trelawny (disambiguation), several people:
 Sir Harry Trelawny, 5th Baronet (1687–1762), British officer
 Harry Trelawny (1726–1800), British general and Coldstream Guards officer, nephew of the 5th Baronet
 Sir Harry Trelawny, 7th Baronet (1756–1834), Protestant preacher and convert to Roman Catholicism, nephew of the general; see Hele's School
 Henry Trelawny (c. 1658 – 1702), British Army officer
 John Trelawny (disambiguation), several people:
 John Trelawny I (fl. 1397), MP for Bodmin (UK Parliament constituency) in 1397, father of John Trelawny II
 John Trelawny II (fl. 1413–1421), MP for Cornwall (UK Parliament constituency) 1413–1421, son of John Trelawny I
 John Trelawny III (fl. 1421–1449), MP for Liskeard (UK Parliament constituency) 1421
 John Trelawny (died 1563), Member of Parliament (MP) for Liskeard
 John Trelawny (died 1568), his son, High Sheriff of Cornwall
 Sir John Trelawny, 1st Baronet (1592–1664), Royalist before and during the English Civil War
 John Trelawny (died 1680), MP for West Looe
 John Trelawny (died 1682), MP for West Looe (UK Parliament constituency)
 John Trelawny (1633–1706), MP for Plymouth (UK Parliament constituency)
 Sir John Trelawny, 4th Baronet (1691–1756), MP for East Looe, West Looe and Liskeard
 Sir John Salusbury-Trelawny, 9th Baronet (1816–1885), MP for Tavistock and Eastern Cornwall
 Jonathan Trelawny (disambiguation), several people:
 Sir Jonathan Trelawny (High Sheriff of Cornwall), Member of Parliament for Liskeard and Cornwall
 Sir Jonathan Trelawny, 2nd Baronet (c. 1623 – 1681), his grandson, Member of Parliament for East Looe, Cornwall and Liskeard
 Jonathan Trelawny (1648-1705), of Plymouth, MP for West Looe (UK Parliament constituency) 1677–1685 and 1690–1695
 Sir Jonathan Trelawny, 3rd Baronet (1650–1721), Bishop of Bristol, Exeter and Winchester
 Petroc Trelawny (born 1971), British radio presenter
 Robert Trelawney (1598–1643), English merchant, politician and colonist
 Samuel Trelawny (1630–1666), English lawyer and politician
 Sir William Trelawny, 6th Baronet (c. 1722 – 1772), British governor of Jamaica

Fictional characters
Sybill Trelawney, a character in the Harry Potter series by J. K. Rowling
Squire Trelawney, a character in Treasure Island by Robert Louis Stevenson
Jill Trelawney, an ambiguous villain in She Was a Lady, part of the Simon Templar series by Leslie Charteris
Doctor Trelawney, the eccentric English naturalist and sometime surgeon in Il Visconte Dimezzato by Italo Calvino
Mr. Trelawney Hope, a character in the Sherlock Holmes story The Adventure of the Second Stain by Arthur Conan Doyle
Petroc Trelawney, a pet rock in the Septimus Heap series by Angie Sage
Sean Trelawney, a character in the 1998 TV drama series The Net
Abel and Margaret Trelawney, characters in Bram Stoker's Gothic horror novel The Jewel of Seven Stars
Dr. Trelawney, the occultist in the A Dance to the Music of Time series by Anthony Powell
Josiah Trelawny, a character in Red Dead Redemption II

See also
 Trelawny (disambiguation)

References